Adrie Poldervaart (born 20 December 1970) iis a Dutch professional football manager and former player who is the head coach of Eerste Divisie club De Graafschap.

Sports career 
Poldervaart played in his youth and senior career exclusively for OHVV Oudenhorn. Poldervaart was hired in 1992 as a sports physiotherapist at Excelsior Rotterdam. He has also been a physiotherapist for VV Nieuwenhoorn.

Next to being a physiotherapist at Excelsior, in 1998 he became player/manager at OHVV. In 2001 Poldervaart became an assistant coach and in 2002 coach for VV Nieuwenhoorn. In 2005 he moved on to VV Spijkenisse. Only in 2012, he changed again, this time for VV Zwaluwen. For his achievements at Zwaluwen Poldervaart received the Rinus Michels Award. From 2015 to 2018 he coached BVV Barendrecht.

In 2018 Poldervaart became the manager of Excelsior. He replaced  Mitchell van der Gaag who left for NAC Breda. After 26 year Poldervaart stopped working as Excelsior's physiotherapist. In 2019, after disappointing results, he stopped coaching Excelsior. Instead, Poldervaart became the assistant coach of FC Groningen.

On 10 May 2022, De Graafschap appointed Poldervaart as head coach on a two-year deal, effective from 1 July, replacing Reinier Robbemond.

References

1970 births
Living people
Dutch football managers
BVV Barendrecht managers
VV Zwaluwen managers
VV Spijkenisse managers
Excelsior Rotterdam managers
De Graafschap managers
FC Groningen non-playing staff
Eerste Divisie managers
Rinus Michels Award winners